Tim Phillips may refer to:
Tim Phillips (cricketer) (born 1981), English cricketer
Tim Phillips (musician), Canadian-born musician
Tim Phillips (political strategist) (born 1964), president of Americans for Prosperity from 2006-2021
Tim Phillips (swimmer) (born 1990), American swimmer
Tim Charles Phillips (born 1966), American investment manager, political activist and philanthropist
Tim Phillipps, Australian  actor